Orkan may refer to:

People

Given name
 Orkan Balkan (born 1997), Turkish football player
 Orkan Çınar (born 1996), Turkish football player

Surname
 Władysław Orkan (1875–1930), Polish writer

Ships
 ORP Orkan, name of several Polish ships
 ORP Orkan (1992), Polish missile boat of the Orkan class
 , a WWII Vorpostenboot

Others
 European windstorm in several European languages
 M-87 Orkan, Yugoslav multiple rocket launcher
 Operation Orkan 91, military operation during the Croatian War of Independence
 Orkan-e Kord, village in Qazvin Province, Iran
 Orkan-e Tork, village in Qazvin Province, Iran
 Orkan (album), a 2012 album by Swedish band Vintersorg
 an alien race from the television series Mork & Mindy

Polish-language surnames

nn:Orkan